Ettenhausen an der Suhl is a village and a former municipality in the Wartburgkreis district of Thuringia, Germany. Since July 2018, it is part of the town Bad Salzungen.

References

Former municipalities in Thuringia
Wartburgkreis